Menntaskólinn á Ísafirði is an Icelandic gymnasium. It is located in Ísafjörður in the Westfjords.

The school year consists of two semesters, fall and spring. Each semester students take a full-time load of courses worth two or three credits each. Over three years, they take a total of 140+ credits and matriculate with an Icelandic Stúdentspróf which is the standard prerequisite for university admission in Iceland. This qualification is also accepted for admission to universities around the world.

History
The school was founded in 1970 and its first principal was Jón Baldvin Hannibalsson. Ólína Þorvarðardóttir was the principal from 2001 until her resignation in 2006.

Principals
Jón Baldvin Hannibalsson (1970–1979)
Björn Teitsson (1979–2001)
Ólína Þorvarðardóttir (2001–2006)
Ingibjörg S. Guðmundsdóttir (2006–2007)
Jón Reynir Sigurvinsson (2007–present)

Notable alumni

Artists
 Eiríkur Örn Norðdahl, writer
 Erpur Eyvindarson, musician
 Þórunn Arna Kristjánsdóttir, actress and singer

Athletes
 Andri Rúnar Bjarnason, footballer

Journalists
 Ingi Freyr Vilhjálmsson, investigative reporter

Politicians
 Einar Kristinn Guðfinnsson, former member of Alþingi
 Ólína Þorvarðardóttir, former member of Alþingi

References

External links 
 

Gymnasiums in Iceland
Educational institutions established in 1970
1970 establishments in Iceland